The 2013 All-Ireland Senior Ladies' Football Championship was the 40th edition of the Ladies' Gaelic Football Association's premier inter-county Ladies' Gaelic football tournament. It was known for sponsorship reasons as the TG4 All-Ireland Senior Ladies' Football Championship. It was won by Cork, who defeated Monaghan in the final.

Results

Preliminary rounds

Finals

References

!